The Oudh and Tirhut Railway was a Railway company operated in India.

History

On 1 January 1943, the Bengal and North Western Railway and the Rohilkund and Kumaon Railway (R&K worked) were acquired by the Government of India and they were amalgamated with the Tirhut Railway, the Mashrak-Thawe Extension Railway (BNW worked) and the Lucknow-Bareilly Railway (R&K worked) to form the Oudh and Tirhut Railway. Its headquarters was at Gorakhpur. 

The Oudh and Tirhut Railway was later renamed the Oudh Tirhut Railway. On 14 April 1952, the Oudh Tirhut Railway was amalgamated with the Assam Railway and the Kanpur-Achnera section of the Bombay, Baroda and Central India Railway to form North Eastern Railway, one of the 16 zones of the current Indian Railways.

Classification
It was labeled as a Class I railway according to Indian Railway Classification System of 1926.

References

Defunct railway companies of India
Railway companies established in 1943
Railway companies disestablished in 1952
History of rail transport in Uttar Pradesh
Indian companies established in 1943
1952 disestablishments in India